Merrin Melissa Dungey (born August 6, 1971) is an American film and television actress, known for her roles on the television series The King of Queens, Alias, Malcolm in the Middle, Summerland, Conviction, The Resident and The Fix. She also appeared as Ursula on Once Upon a Time. Since March 2022, Dungey plays series regular Kam in Shining Vale.

Early life and education
Dungey was born and raised in Sacramento, California, the younger daughter of Don Dungey, a general services manager and Judith Dungey. As a child she was active in ballet and dance as well as piano. Dungey was also an accomplished ice skater. Dungey graduated in 1989 from Rio Americano High School in Sacramento, California. After high school Dungey earned a degree of Bachelor of Arts from UCLA in 1993. Dungey has a sister, Channing Dungey who was president of ABC Entertainment and is the CEO of Warner Bros. Television Studios.

Career
Dungey had small roles in Hollywood films such as EDtv and Deep Impact and on television series such as Martin, before landing the recurring role of Kelly Palmer on the CBS television series The King of Queens, in which she starred from 1999 to 2007. She appeared in each season of the series except for the 2002–03 season. Dungey is also well known for her role as Francie Calfo on the drama series Alias from 2001 to 2003, as well as making an appearance on the 2006 series finale episode All the Time in the World. She also had a recurring role on the FOX sitcom Malcolm in the Middle as Stevie's mother, Kitty Kenarban. At one point in 2001 Dungey was appearing in all three shows (The King of Queens, Malcolm in the Middle, and Alias) at the same time. Dungey portrayed Susannah in the WB drama series Summerland from 2004 to 2005. She has also guest-starred on various TV series including Living Single, ER, Murphy Brown, Seinfeld, Friends, The West Wing, Babylon 5, and Curb Your Enthusiasm. Dungey appeared in two episodes of Grey's Anatomy that served as a  backdoor pilot for Private Practice, but was replaced by actress Audra McDonald for the series.

Dungey guest-starred on the ABC sitcoms Surviving Suburbia starring Bob Saget, Better Off Ted starring Portia de Rossi, Castle starring Nathan Fillion, and HBO's Hung starring Thomas Jane. She portrayed Ellie on the Nick at Nite television series Hollywood Heights in 2012 and had a recurring role as Alissa Barnes on ABC's Betrayal in 2013. In 2014 she appeared in a featured role opposite Pierce Brosnan in Some Kind of Beautiful. Also in 2014 she began portraying the recurring roles of Ursula on ABC's Once Upon a Time and Sharon Jeffords on Brooklyn Nine-Nine. Dungey played investigator Maxine Bohen on the ABC legal drama Conviction from October 2016 to May 2017. In September 2017, she joined the cast of the medical drama The Resident as Claire Thorpe. Dungey next appeared as C.J. Bernstein in the ABC legal drama The Fix.

In February 2021, Dungey was cast in the series regular role of Kam in the Starz series Shining Vale. The series premiered in March 2022, and was later picked up for a second season in May 2022.

Personal life
In May 2007, Dungey married Matthew Drake in a mariachi-style wedding ceremony in Cancun, Mexico. She gave birth to their first daughter in June 2008, and a second daughter in 2011. Dungey and Drake separated in 2018 and divorced in 2021.

Filmography

Film

Television

References

External links
 
 PopGurls 20 Questions with Merrin Dungey

1971 births
Living people
Actresses from Sacramento, California
University of California, Los Angeles alumni
African-American actresses
American television actresses
American film actresses
20th-century American actresses
21st-century American actresses
UCLA Film School alumni
20th-century African-American women
20th-century African-American people
21st-century African-American women
21st-century African-American people